Pararge xiphioides, the Canary speckled wood, is a butterfly of the family Nymphalidae. It is found in the Canary Islands on La Gomera, La Palma, Tenerife and Gran Canaria.

Adults are on wing year-round.

The larvae feed on various plants, including Brachypodium sylvaticum, Agrostis capillaris, Carex divulsa and Luzula forsteri.

It is closely related to the species Pararge aegeria. differing thus xiphioides Stgr. (45a), from the Canary Islands, has the upperside darker on account of the smaller and more red-brown spots, while the underside of the hindwing is lighter, less marmorated and provided with a distinct median band, the costal part of which is shaded with white.

References

External links
Satyrinae of the Western Palearctic
 Mario Maier: Europäische Schmetterlinge
www.schmetterling-raupe.de
Moths and Butterflies of Europe and North Africa
Captain's European Butterfly Guide
"Pararge Hübner, [1819]" at Markku Savela's Lepidoptera and Some Other Life Forms
Fauna Europaea

Elymniini
Butterflies described in 1871
Taxa named by Otto Staudinger